The Olsen Gang in a Fix is a 1969 Danish comedy film directed by Erik Balling and starring Ove Sprogøe. The film was the second in the Olsen-banden-series.

Plot
After yet another unsuccessful robbery Egon is jailed. When released, he has now been rehabilitated by the pretty social worker Bodil. He works permanently and hopes to impress by being a lawful citizen. Despite Benny and Kjelds regret Egon is clear in his mind, and the gang ends up as a bunch of lawful citizens.

Although it starts well for the gang, they are eventually thrown back into the criminal runway, when they are accused of a robbery committed right in front of them in the National Bank, where they serve as cleaning people. Although the police think that the gang committed the robbery, it is in fact the mafia boss Serafimo (Harold Stone) who ordered his gang members to rob the suitcase, allegedly containing the Danish crown jewels.

The gang, who are now really in the fix, must bring back the jewels in order to avoid the accusation. They succeed by getting the suitcase out of the airport as the gangsters are planning to run away, however, the gangsters tracks them all the way to their residing place, a bar in Copenhagen, which ends up being shot to pieces by the gangsters. Now they are not only wanted by the gangsters, but also by the officious detective Mortensen. Through a variety of disguises they manage to trick the gangsters and get hold of the jewels and after a long car chase they encounter Benny's slightly alcoholic brother Dynamite-Harry, an expert in explosives who promises to open the suitcase at a remote construction site.

Unbeknownst to the gang and Harry, a team of German assassins, hired by Serafimo, are tracking them down, to wipe the gang out for good and reconquer the jewels. They fail to do this as Harry accidentally blows the Germans up. The suitcase, however, remains unopened and Egon is fuming. Finally, Serafimo arrives in a helicopter along with Bodil, who thinks that she has rehabilitated Serafimo. The gang take the suitcase, but Serafimo has creepy ulterior motives. Depressed and scared, Benny and Kjeld go home to encounter a fuming Yvonne, who could afford new things through Kjelds work, but after Kjeld got fired she had to hand it all over to the bailiff. They are tremendously surprised, however, to discover that Yvonne, with no little help from Bodil, has got all the things back.

The film ends with Egon entering the bar to drown his sorrows. He is met by a slightly nervous bartender, who is scared because the bar has been shot down several times during the course of the movie. Egon calms him down, but then Mortensen enters the bar. He is armed to the teeth and the bar is yet again shot to pieces. Mortensen arrests Egon, who is puzzled and asks why. Mortensen replies by mentioning several petty crimes committed by Egon during the hunt for the jewels, and Egon is yet again imprisoned.

Cast

 Ove Sprogøe as Egon Olsen
 Morten Grunwald as Benny Frandsen
 Poul Bundgaard as Kjeld Jensen
 Ghita Nørby as Frk. Bodil Hansen
 Peter Steen as Kriminalassistent William Mortensen
 Preben Kaas as Dynamit Harry (Frandsen)
 Poul Reichhardt as Politichefen
 Paul Hagen as Tjener Hansen
 Kirsten Walther as Yvonne Jensen
 Karl Stegger as K.O.R.S. inspektør
 Birger Jensen as Dynamit Harry's lærling
 Jes Holtsø as Børge Jensen
 Harold J. Stone as Serafimo Mozerella
 Gert Bastian
 Svend Bille as Direktør for legetøjsfabrik
 Anders Bodelsen
 Edward Fleming as Serafimos håndlanger
 Benny Hansen as Politibetjent, chauffør
 Kirsten Hansen-Møller
 Lise Henningsen
 Edith Hermansen
 Paul Hüttel as Bankrøver
 Wladirmir Kandel
 Palle Kjærulff-Schmidt as Chauffør under biljagt
 Viggo Larsen
 Ernst Meyer as Scared man in car under car chase
 Bjørn Puggaard-Müller as Guard in Nationalbanken
 André Sallyman
 Jørgen Teytaud
 Johan Thiersen
 Poul Thomsen as Værkfører på legetøjsfabrik
 Holger Vistisen as Præst der taler i telefon

References

External links
 
 

1969 films
1969 comedy films
1960s heist films
1960s Danish-language films
Films directed by Erik Balling
Films with screenplays by Erik Balling
Olsen-banden films
Danish comedy films